Roseland was an electoral division of Cornwall in the United Kingdom which returned one member to sit on Cornwall Council between 2009 and 2021. It was abolished at the 2021 local elections, being succeeded by St Goran, Tregony and the Roseland.

Councillors

Extent
Roseland represented the villages of St Mawes, Bohortha, Gerrans, Portscatho, St Just in Roseland, St Michael Penkevil, Ruan Lanihorne, Ruan High Lanes, Veryan, Portloe, Portholland, St Michael Caerhays and Philleigh, as well as the hamlets of Trewithian, Carne, Treworga, Treviskey and Treworlas. Parts of Tresillian (shared with Ladock, St Clement and St Erme division) were also covered.

The division was affected by boundary changes at the 2013 election. From 2009 to 2013, the division covered 7838 hectares in total; after the boundary changes in 2013, it covered 8638 hectares.

Election results

2017 election

2013 election

2009 election

References

Electoral divisions of Cornwall Council